Sophia Kruithof (born 6 May 2002) is a Dutch singer-songwriter who won the 10th season of the Voice of Holland.

During the finals she presented her self-written first single Alaska.

Discography

Singles
 "Alaska" (2020)
"Where Everybody Knows Your Name"  (2020)

References

Living people
The Voice (franchise) winners
21st-century Dutch singers
2002 births
21st-century Dutch women singers